Ukrsotsbank (in 2013–2016 known as UniCredit Bank – Ukrsotsbank) was a Ukrainian bank. It was a subsidiary of Alfa Group via a Luxembourg incorporated company АВН Holdings. In October 2019 Ukrsotsbank was fully merged with Alfa-Bank (Ukraine).

History

Bank Pekao – UniCredit

Ukrsotsbank

On 11 January 2016 UniCredit Group sold Ukrsotsbank to ABH Holdings, a subsidiary of Alfa Group. In exchange, UniCredit acquired 9.9% stake of ABH Holdings. In October 2019 Ukrsotsbank was fully merged with Alfa-Bank (Ukraine), who became the "full successor of all rights and obligations of Ukrsotsbank with respect to its clients, partners and counterparties."

Gallery

See also
Other Ukrainian banks created in the Soviet Union
 Prominvestbank
 State Savings Bank of Ukraine

References

External links
 UniCredit Online for Ukrsotsbank (showing association with the UniCredit)

Banks established in 1997
Banks disestablished in 2019
Defunct banks of Ukraine
Companies based in Kyiv
Former UniCredit subsidiaries
Banks of the Soviet Union
1997 establishments in Ukraine
2019 disestablishments in Ukraine